Henry W. Smith House is a historic home located in Clay Township, Indiana.  It was built in 1859, and is a two-story, brick dwelling on a fieldstone foundation.  While primarily Italianate in style, the house incorporates elements of Federal, Gothic Revival, and Greek Revival styles.  It has a steep cross-gable and features a front porch with Tuscan order columns.

It was listed on the National Register of Historic Places in 1979.

References

Houses on the National Register of Historic Places in Indiana
Italianate architecture in Indiana
Houses completed in 1859
Buildings and structures in Howard County, Indiana
National Register of Historic Places in Howard County, Indiana
1859 establishments in Indiana